Black Lips is an American garage rock band from Atlanta, Georgia formed in 1999.

History
The band formed in Dunwoody, Georgia, after guitarist Cole Alexander and bassist Jared Swilley left the Renegades, and guitarist Ben Eberbaugh left the Reruns. Alexander and Swilley were known for their crude antics both during shows and at school. They were kicked out of school during their senior year after the Columbine Massacre in 1999 because they were regarded as a "subculture danger." Drummer Joe Bradley, who had been studying in college after graduating high school early, joined a few months later. They released their first 7-inch in 2002 with tracks from their first ever studio LP ~ completed in 2000 with producer/guitarist Eric Gagnon of The El Caminos. The 7-inch featured Ain't Coming Back, B 52 Bomberboy, Can't Get Me Down and Stone Cold all of which were tracked, mixed and mastered by Gagnon, and was released on their own record label, Die Slaughterhaus.  Just days before a tour was to begin in December 2002, guitarist Ben Eberbaugh was driving a car when he was struck by a drunk driver and killed. The band carried on, believing that Eberbaugh would want them to continue.

The band's debut full-length album, Black Lips!, was released on Bomp! Records in 2003. Within this tribute album commemorating Ben Eberbaugh's life as a quality musician, they released three more songs from their set with Gagnon (2000): Stone Cold (with gagnon on bass), Can't Get Me Down and Everybody Loves A Cocksucker were already mixed and mastered by Eric. They were wise enough to have Stone Cold remastered  with the channels flipped from the original two track mix ~ a clever way to avoid legal trouble from a keen producer. Back in 2000, Jared put himself in rehab during the studio session with Eric, so Cole asked Gagnon to play bass both in the studio and during a live show at The Earl (Atlanta, GA) ~ Eric agreed so long as he didn't have to record anymore firecrackers in his studio ("Ain't Coming Back").  Eberbaugh's bluesy guitar takes control of their early work ~ Eric was a perfect match for these youngsters ~ with a knack for the blues, Eric features Ben's guitar. After his untimely death in 2002, Ben's legacy was filled by Jack Hines, a friend of the band members, and they recorded their second studio album, We Did Not Know the Forest Spirit Made the Flowers Grow, with him. Hines quit the band in 2004 so he could settle down with his wife. Ian St. Pé, who at the time was enrolled at the University of Memphis as a music major, got a call from the band asking if he wanted to immediately join them on tour. Pé, who spent his early twenties buying alcohol for his then-underage future bandmates, dropped out of school and accepted the band's offer. In 2005, they released two more 7 inch vinyls through Slovenly Recordings.  Eric Gagnon produced both "Stuck In My Mind" and "Does She Want" - which were tracked, mixed and mastered by Gagnon back in 2000.  They slowly built a fanbase that appreciated their rough pastiche of blues, rock, doo-wop, country, and punk. They gained national attention in 2006 with features in Spin and Rolling Stone. The band got exposure in The New York Times during the 2007 South by Southwest music festival in Austin, Texas, in which they played a dozen shows over a three-day period.

Their debut for Vice Records, Los Valientes del Mundo Nuevo, was released in February 2007. It is supposed to have been recorded at a bar in Tijuana, Mexico, but fans, musicians, and journalists have expressed doubts about that claim and speculated that some or most of it was recorded in a studio with John Reis. Responding to such allegations, Swilley has stated that Reis recorded the show live with a soundboard, microphones, and a computer placed strategically near the stage. St. Pe said that the band had to use the best twelve out of twenty live cuts from the Tijuana show, which he described as "absolutely nuts." In September 2007 their second studio album for Vice entitled Good Bad Not Evil was released. The Black Lips made their American national television debut in October 2007 on Late Night with Conan O'Brien and played "O Katrina". In May 2008 Black Lips made their UK TV debut performing 'Bad Kids' on BBC3's The Wall. The Black Lips were to star in the film Let It Be, in which they portrayed musicians in a fictitious 1980s era DIY band called The Renegades. The movie was set for production in the summer of 2008; however, in a September 2008 interview, the band admitted they became disenchanted with the project after viewing the trailer and seeing the way they felt they were going to be portrayed in the movie.

In October 2008 a portion of the band's song "Veni Vidi Vici" was played during the season premiere episode of the television show Dirty Sexy Money, shown on the American network ABC. The same song was going to be used in a commercial by British supermarket chain Tesco, but, according to the band, the company decided not to go through with the deal because of concerns with the lyrical content of the song. The group toured India in January 2009. Following some antics at their show in Chennai, the band became worried about being arrested and imprisoned for "homosexual acts" so they fled the city and eventually the country. The band summed up what happened in an interview at the musical festival: "they kissed, and some weiners were pulled out..." Vice Records documented the trip. After the band left India, they traveled to Berlin, Germany and recorded a 12-song LP of gospel-influenced songs with King Khan & BBQ. The album was released on September 22, 2009, under the name The Almighty Defenders.

The Black Lips released their fifth studio album, 200 Million Thousand, on February 24, 2009, on Vice Records,with the help of Zach, Meredith, and Austin. The songs were recorded at New Street Studio, a former art gallery in Decatur GA, near Atlanta. The band embarked on a world tour in 2009 to support this album. Over the course of eleven months, they played 122 shows total between Europe and the United States. The band have a featured role in the documentary We Fun: Atlanta, GA Inside Out. The title was coined by Jared Swilley on the band's blog. The film made its debut at the Atlanta Film Festival in April 2009. A song called "Arboles De La Barranca" was performed by Black Lips for the film Rudo y Cursi. Volume six of Brendan Canty's Burn To Shine series includes a performance by the Black Lips. There is no release date set for.

The band began working on their sixth studio record, Arabia Mountain, in November 2009. They finished recording the album with producer Mark Ronson in New York City in November 2010. The first single off Arabia Mountain was "Modern Art".

In October 2019, the band announced they had signed to Fire Records. The band released their ninth studio album 'Sing In A World That's Falling Apart' on the 24th January 2020 with Fire Records, in partnership with Vice. On the review aggregate site Metacritic, the album has a score of 76 out of 100, indicating "Generally favorable reviews",  with PopMatters describing the record as a "near perfect offering".

Live shows

The Black Lips are noted for provocative theatrics – including vomiting (Cole's medical condition), urination, nudity, electric R.C. car races, fireworks, a chicken, flaming guitars and other un-predictable antics. These have been inspired by the "punk-before-punk" Viennese Actionism movement in Austria and the infamous actionist hardcore punk musician GG Allin according to Alexander. Most of these antics, which are the center of attention in media coverage of the band, occurred in the band's early days, a time when the band had not yet learned how to play their instruments. The frequency of the group's outrageous stage antics has declined slightly, as they claim to have matured "a little bit". Despite frequent media attention surrounding their antics, Swilley says "it doesn't seem all that crazy to me. It’s not like we have ever done a human sacrifice on stage or anything like that.” 

They played at Heaven in London on September 16, 2008, which ended with a classic stage invasion, and has become their most popular live YouTube video. The group has expressed interest in playing venues and countries that typically don't see many rock bands perform. They've said they'd like to play Africa, South America, China, and Indonesia, but have not done so yet. In 2010 the band toured Australia, New Zealand and Japan. In conjunction with SPINearth.tv, the group documented the behind the scenes footage of their infamous antics. In 2012 the band performed a long discussed Middle East tour which included dates in Iraq and several other countries in the region.

On February 7, 2016, The Black Lips performed live on Adult Swim's Fish Center Live during Super Bowl 50.

Side projects
Ian St. Pe has a project called Saint Pé. St. Pe also plays guitar in another band called Diamond Rugs, which features members of Deer Tick, Dead Confederate, Los Lobos, and Six Finger Satellite.  Diamond Rugs will be releasing their debut album on Partisan Records in 2012. Jared Swilley provides guitar and vocals for The Gaye Blades, who have released two 7-inches on  Rob's House Records and an LP on Norton Records. In late Summer 2008 band member Bobby Ubangi was diagnosed with small cell lung and brain cancer. He died in Summer 2009 and is referred to in the Black Lips songs "Dirty Hands" and "I'll Be With You." Under the name Old King Cole Younger, Cole Alexander released a split single on Rob's House Records with Bradford Cox of Deerhunter performing under the name of Atlas Sound. Cole Alexander and Bradford Cox also have a project called Ghetto Cross. Joe Bradley produced a rap group called Incoqnekro. They recorded an album titled Incoqnekronomicon, which was released online in 2009.

Three Black Lips, Cole Alexander (vocals), Jared Swilley (bass) and Joe Bradley (keyboards), perform as ghost-rock band The Spooks. The Spooks formed in 2002 to play Halloween shows. The band members wear white sheets on stage, and performances have included blood, animal parts and a chainsaw. They began recording songs for an album in 2004, and their first LP, Death From Beyond The Grave, was released by Die Slaughterhaus in late 2008.

Cole Alexander and Curtis Harding (Cee Lo Green's former back-up singer/writer) have been working on a project titled Night Sun

Personnel
Current members

 Cole Alexander (born on June 8, 1982) – vocals, guitar (1999–present)
 Jared Swilley (born on August 8, 1983) – vocals, bass guitar (1999–present)
 Oakley Munson – drums, vocals (2017–present)
 Zumi Rosow – vocals, saxophone (2013–present)
 Jeff Clarke – guitar, vocals (2018–present)

Former members

 Ben Eberbaugh (born on January 29, 1980 – died on December 1, 2002) – guitar, vocals (1999–2002)
 Jack Hines – guitar, vocals (2002–2004, 2014–2017)
 Ian St. Pe – guitar (2004–2014, late 2017)
 Joe Bradley (born on February 3, 1984) – vocals, drums (1999–2017)

Timeline

Discography

Studio albums
 Black Lips! - 2003 (Bomp! Records)
 We Did Not Know the Forest Spirit Made the Flowers Grow - 2004 (Bomp! Records)
 Let It Bloom - 2005 (In The Red Records)
 Good Bad Not Evil - 2007 (Vice Records)
 200 Million Thousand - 2009 (Vice Records)
 Arabia Mountain - 2011 (Vice Records)
 Underneath the Rainbow - 2014 (Vice Records)  Billboard 200 # 143
 Satan's Graffiti or God’s Art? - 2017 (Vice Records)
 Sing in a World That’s Falling Apart - 2020 (Fire Records/Vice Records)
 Apocalypse Love - 2022 (Fire Records)

Live albums
 Live @ WFMU - 2005 (Dusty Medical Records)
 Los Valientes del Mundo Nuevo - 2007 (Vice Records)
 Live at Third Man Records - 2012 (Third Man Records)

Singles
 "Ain't Comin' Back" 7" - 2002 (Die Slaughterhaus)
 "Freakout" 7" - 2002 (The Electric Human Project)
 "Ain't Comin' Back" 7" - 2003 (Munster Records)
 "Live at the Jam Club" 7" - 2004 (Shake Your Ass Records)
 "Does She Want" 7" - 2005 (Slovenly Recordings)
 "In and Out" 7" - 2005 (Slovenly Recordings)
 "Born to Be a Man" 7" - 2005 (Varmint Records)
 "Party at Rob's House" 7" - 2006 (Rob's House Records)
 "Born to Be a Man" 7" - 2006 Re-release with different cover (Bachelor Records)
 "Not a Problem" 7" - 2007 (Vice Records UK)
 "Cold Hands" 7" - 2007 (Vice Records UK)
 "O Katrina!" 7" - 2007 (Vice Records UK)
 "Veni Vidi Vici" 7" - 2007 (Vice Records UK)
 "O Katrina! Australian Tour" 7" - 2007 (Juvenile Records)
 "Bad Kids / Leroy Faster" 7" - 2008 (Vice Records UK)
 "Short Fuse" 7" - 2009 (Vice Records UK)
 "I'll Be with You" 7" - 2009 (Vice Records UK)
 "Disconnection/99 Victs" 7" - 2009 (Sub Pop Records Singles Club)
 "Drugs" 7" - (Vice Records UK)
 "Before You Judge Me" - (adult swim singles)
 "Modern Art" - 2011 (Vice Records)
 "Family Tree" - 2011
 "Sick of You" - 2012 (Vice Records)
 "Can't Hold On" - 2017 (Vice Records)
 "Squatting in Heaven" - 2017 (Vice Records)
 "Occidental Front" (featuring Yoko Ono) - 2017 (Vice Records)
 "Crystal Night" - 2017 (Vice Records)
 "Get It On Time" - 2020 (Fire Records/Vice Records)
 "Gentleman" - 2021 (Fire Records/Vice Records)
 "No Rave" - 2022 (Fire Records)

Splits
 "Black Stereo/Dirt Mono" - 2006 with The Dirtbombs (Cass Records)
 "What To Do/Factory Girl" - with the Demon's Claws (Norton Records)
 "Fader" = 2007 split with YACHT
 "Christmas in Baghdad/Plump Righteous" - 2007 with The King Khan & BBQ Show (Norton Records)
 "Whirlyball" - 2007 with Baby Shakes, Gentleman Jesse & His Men, and Coffin Bound (Chunklet Magazine)
 "Live at the Clermont Lounge" - 2008 with the Subsonics (Rob's House Records)
 "MIA/Day Turns To Night/The Rest Of My Days/Little Prince - 2008 with the Carbonas, Gentleman Jesse & His Men, and Predator (Rob's House Records)
 "Best Napkin I Ever Had/The Doorway" - 2010 with Pierced Arrows (Scion AV)
 "Cowboy Knights" - 2013 with Icky Blossoms (Saddle Creek Records)

References

External links
Official website
Official Black Lips MySpace
BBC article
Interview with The Black Lips' Jared Swilley
Official Discography
Podcast Interview with Cole 
Captainsoncho.org
The Black Lips Interview: Truth Behind Indian Chaos
Black Lips at Fire Records

1999 establishments in Georgia (U.S. state)
American garage rock groups
American psychedelic rock music groups
Punk rock groups from Georgia (U.S. state)
Musical groups from Atlanta
Musical groups established in 1999
Third Man Records artists
In the Red artists
Bomp! Records artists
Fire Records (UK) artists